Thorunna daniellae is a species of sea slug, a dorid nudibranch, a shell-less marine gastropod mollusc in the family Chromodorididae.

Distribution 
Hawaiian islands, Midway, and Kure; widely distributed in the Indo-Pacific.

Description
The size of the body varies between 13 mm and 20 mm. This species is opaque white with a magenta line encircling the notum just inside the mantle margin. The rhinophore stalks are translucent, with the clubs orange-red on the anterior side and opaque white on the posterior side. The gills are opaque white with orange-red tips. In very young animals, the notum is translucent and has a herringbone pattern of embedded white spicules beginning between the rhinophores and ending at the gills.

Ecology

References

External links
 
 

Chromodorididae
Gastropods described in 1969